Stenanthera pinifolia, commonly known as pine heath, is a species of shrub that is endemic to south-eastern Australia. It has narrow, linear leaves, yellow or red tubular flowers and a small edible berry.

Description
The flowers are erect, more or less sessile and arranged singly in leaf axils but often appear clustered at the base of branches. Flowering occurs from spring to summer.

Taxonomy and naming
Stenanthera pinifolia was first formally described in 1810 by Robert Brown in Prodromus Florae Novae Hollandiae et Insulae Van Diemen. The specific epithet (pinifolia) is derived from Latin words meaning "pine" and "-leaved".

Distribution and habitat
Pine heath mainly grows in heath and heathy woodland or forest in sandy or rocky places. It occurs along the coast and nearby tablelands of New South Wales south from Evans Head, mainly in the Grampians but also further east in Victoria, and in Tasmania.

References

pinifolia
Ericales of Australia
Flora of New South Wales
Flora of Victoria (Australia)
Flora of Tasmania
Plants described in 1810